Ľubomír Gorelčík (born 13 March 1997) is a Slovak football forward who currently plays for the Fortuna Liga club MŠK Žilina.

MŠK Žilina
He made his debut for the MŠK Žilina senior side on 30 November 2014 in the Fortuna Liga match against FC DAC 1904 Dunajská Streda, coming on as a '90 minute substitute for Matej Jelić, in the 3-1 home win for the Žilina side.

External links
 MŠK Žilina profile
 
 Futbalnet profile
 UEFA profile

References

1997 births
Living people
Slovak footballers
Association football forwards
MŠK Žilina players
Slovak Super Liga players